Bernard Fernyhough (2 September 1932) was an Anglican priest. He was the Archdeacon of Oakham from 1977 to 1999.

Fernyhough was educated at Wolstanton Grammar School and Saint David's College, Lampeter. He was ordained in 1955 and his first appointment was as Precentor at Trinidad Cathedral. He was then Rector of Stoke Bruerne and Vicar of Ravensthorpe before his years as an archdeacon. He died on 19 February 2000.

Notes

1932 births
People educated at Wolstanton Grammar School
Alumni of the University of Wales, Lampeter
Archdeacons of Oakham
2000 deaths